BK Fremad Amager is a Danish professional association football club based in Sundbyvester, Copenhagen. This list details the club's achievements in all competitive tournaments including the league's average attendance figures and top scorers from the founding of the club in June 1910 up to the most recent season. The Amager-based club did not play organised league football and only participated in friendly matches for its first two years of existence. In 1912, Fremad Amager were an integral part in the formation of the subregional football association Amager Boldspil-Union (ABU) and a few years later they also participated in the founding of the wider-reaching Københavns Forstadsklubbers Boldspil Union (KFBU) until applying and eventually joining the regional football association Københavns Boldspil-Union (KBU) in 1920. It features the club's periods of amateurism, semi-amateurism and professional football, including their involvement in the superstructure FC Amager.

In the first league season for seniors arranged by Amager Football Association, BK Fremad Amager finished in second place with 6 points, four points after their local rivals B 1908 in first place. The first competitive league match was played at their home ground in April 1912 against B 1908, resulting in a 0–13 loss, as part of the first match in the official regional football championship for the island of Amager. Københavns Forstadsklubbers Boldspil Union organised a cup tournament with the surrounding districts of Copenhagen in which the club participated as a representative for Amager. Following their new extraordinary membership of the Copenhagen Football Association (KBU) in 1920, the club became a full member the following year, in 1921. The club advanced from its initial regional level three division, Deltagerturneringen, to KBU's highest regional division, KBUs Mesterskabsrække in 1926, which at the time was considered the best regional football league in Denmark, featuring several national football team players. Between 1920 and 1927, the club only played in the regional leagues and cup tournaments in Copenhagen, and did not qualify for the national league championship play-offs, the Landsfodboldturneringen.

Fremad Amager competed in the first season of the nationwide league tournament, 1927–28 Danmarksmesterskabsturneringen, under the auspices of the Danish Football Association (DBU), and have since primarily played in the top five tiers of the Danish football league system, participating in the Danmarksturneringen i fodbold in all but two seasons. The club's most successful period was surrounding the outbreak World War II, when they became runners-up of the top-flight league on two occasions, in the seasons 1939–40 and 1940–41. The club's debut in the KBUs Pokalturnering came in the 1925 edition, regularly participating in the regional cup until the 1953 edition, when the tournament was replaced by the newly formed nationwide cup, DBUs Landspokalturnering. They have played a total of 20 seasons in the Danish top-flight division and have reached the Danish Cup final on one occasion, which qualified the team for their only European tournament partake, the 1972–73 European Cup Winners' Cup.

Key
Key to league competitions:

 Level 1: Danmarksmesterskabsturneringen (1927–1929), Mesterskabsserien (1929–1940), Danmarksturneringen (1940–1945), 1. division (1945–1990), Superligaen (1991–present)
 Level 2: Oprykningsserien (1929–1936), II. Serie (1936–1940), 2. division (1945–1990), Kvalifikationsligaen (1992s, 1993s, 1994s, 1995s), 1. division (1991–present)
 Level 3: III. Serie (1936–1940), 3. division (1945–1990), 2. division (1991–present)
 Level 4: Kvalifikationsturneringen (1959–1965), Kvalifikationsrækken (1996–2000), 3. division (2021–present)
 Level 5: Danmarksserien for herrer (1966–present)
 Level 6 (Level 1 under DBU Copenhagen): KBUs Mesterskabsrække (1920–1936), KBUs A-række (1936–1947), Københavnsserien A / Københavnsserien B (1947–1977), Københavnsserien (1978–present)
 Level 7 (Level 2 under DBU Copenhagen): KBUs A-række (1920–1936), KBUs B-række (1936–1947), KBUs Mellemrække (1947–1984), KBUs Serie 1 (1985–2011), DBU København Serie 1 (2011–present)
 Level 8 (Level 3 under DBU Copenhagen): KBUs Deltagerturnering & KBUs Forstadsturnering (1920–21), KBUs B-række (1921–1936), KBUs C-række (1944–1947), KBUs A-række (1947–1984), KBUs Serie 2 (1985–2011), DBU København Serie 2 (2011–present)

Key to colours and symbols:

Key to league record:
 Season = The year and article of the season
 Position = Final position in table
 Level = Level in the football league system
 P = Games played
 W = Games won
 D = Games drawn
 L = Games lost
 F = Goals scored
 A = Goals against
 Pts = Points

Key to cup record:
 En-dash (–) = Did not participate
 DSQ = Disqualified
 DNE = Did not enter cup play
 QR1 = First qualification round, etc.
 GS = Group stage
 GS2 = Second group stage
 R1 = First round, etc.
 R16 = Round of 16
 QF = Quarter-finals
 SF = Semi-finals
 RU = Runners-up
 W = Winners

Seasons 
Results of league and cup competitions by season.

Footnotes

References

Seasons
Danish football club seasons